iF/A-18E Carrier Strike Fighter is a combat flight simulation game developed and published by Interactive Magic for Microsoft Windows in 1998.

Reception

The game received mixed reviews according to the review aggregation website GameRankings.

See also
iF-22
iF-16

References

External links
 

1998 video games
Combat flight simulators
Video games developed in the United States
Windows games
Windows-only games